The 1988 Iowa State Senate elections took place as part of the biennial 1988 United States elections. Iowa voters elected state senators in half of the state senate's districts—the 25 even-numbered state senate districts. State senators serve four-year terms in the Iowa State Senate, with half of the seats up for election each cycle. A statewide map of the 50 state Senate districts in the year 1988 is provided by the Iowa General Assembly here.

The primary election on June 7, 1988 determined which candidates appeared on the November 8, 1988 general election ballot. Primary election results can be obtained here. General election results can be obtained here.

Following the previous election, Democrats had control of the Iowa state Senate with 30 seats to Republicans' 20 seats.

To take control of the chamber from Democrats, the Republicans needed to net 6 Senate seats.

Democrats retained control of the Iowa State Senate following the 1988 general election  with the balance of power unchanged: Democrats holding 30 seats and Republicans having 20 seats after the 1988 election.

Summary of Results
NOTE: The 25 odd-numbered districts did not have elections in 1988 so they are not listed here.

Source:

Detailed Results
Reminder: Only even-numbered Iowa Senate seats were up for election in 1988; therefore, odd-numbered seats did not have elections in 1988 & are not shown.

Note: If a district does not list a primary, then that district did not have a competitive primary (i.e., there may have only been one candidate file for that district).

District 2

District 4

District 6

District 8

District 10

District 12

District 14

District 16

District 18

District 20

District 22

District 24

District 26

District 28

District 30

District 32

District 34

District 36

District 38

District 40

District 42

District 44

District 46

District 48

District 50

See also
 United States elections, 1988
 United States House of Representatives elections in Iowa, 1988
 Elections in Iowa

References

Senate election 
Iowa Senate elections
Iowa State Senate
Iowa State Senate